Kuo Chie-Hsiung (born 25 May 1940) is a Taiwanese professional golfer.

Kuo played on the Japan Golf Tour, winning four times including three tournaments in a five week span during 1979, and the Asia Golf Circuit, winning nine tournaments. He was the 1974 Asia Golf Circuit champion after wins in the Indian and Taiwan opens, and narrowly missed out of defending the championship the following year when topped the money list but finished half a point behind Hsieh Min-Nan despite winning three tournaments during the season. He also led the money list in 1978, but was again runner-up in the points race.

Kuo also had a great deal of success in his homeland and won many other tournaments throughout Asia.

Professional wins (30)

Japan Golf Tour wins (4)

*Note: Tournament shortened to 54/63 holes due to weather.
1Co-sanctioned by the Asia Golf Circuit

Japan Golf Tour playoff record (2–0)

Asia Golf Circuit wins (9)
1974 Indian Open, Taiwan Open
1975 Philippine Open, Taiwan Open, Korea Open
1978 Indonesia Open, Dunlop International Open (also a Japan Golf Tour event)
1980 Hong Kong Open, Taiwan Open

Other wins (12)
1967 ROC PGA Championship
1972 ROC PGA Championship
1974 ROC PGA Championship
1977 Kaohsiung Open, Dunhill International Match-Play (Philippines)
1978 Kaohsiung Open
1986 Chiang Kei-Shek Memorial Tournament
1987 Tamsui Open
1988 Mercuries Taiwan Masters
1989 BMW Open, Beihai Open
1991 Kaohsiung Open

Senior wins (6)
1992 Japan BMW Seniors Open
1993 Japan Nagoya TV Cup Seniors
1995 Japan Nagoya TV Cup Seniors, Kuo-Hua Match Play, PGA Seniors and Womens Championship
1999 PGA Seniors and Womens Championship

Team appearances
Amateur
Eisenhower Trophy (representing Taiwan): 1962, 1964

Professional
World Cup (representing Taiwan): 1974, 1975, 1976, 1977
Dunhill Cup (representing Taiwan): 1990

References

External links

Kuo Chie-Hsiung at the Taiwan PGA official site (in Chinese)
Asian Senior Masters profile

Taiwanese male golfers
Japan Golf Tour golfers
1940 births
Living people